Acropolis Now was an Australian television sitcom set in a fictional Greek cafe, called the "Acropolis Cafe" in Melbourne that ran for 63 episodes broadcast from 9 August 1989 to 4 November 1992 on the Seven Network. It was created by Nick Giannopoulos, George Kapiniaris and Simon Palomares, who also starred in the series. They were already quite well known for their comedy stage show, Wogs out of Work. The title is a nameplay on the film Apocalypse Now. Each episode was 20 minutes in length and filmed in front of a live audience.

Program synopsis
Jim's (Giannopoulos) father asks him to run the family business, the Acropolis café, when he suddenly leaves Australia to return to his homeland Greece. The series centres on the activities of the cafe staff. Greek Jim Stefanidis, is the immature owner and his best friend, Spaniard Ricky Martinez (Palomares) is the sensible manager (seasons 1-2 only). Memo (Kapiniaris) is the traditional Greek waiter, Liz is the liberated Australian waitress. Skip is the naïve new cook from the bush and Manolis is the stubborn cook from the old cafe. The show's humour arises from the clash of cultures and beliefs.

Jim's hairdresser cousin Effie, played by Mary Coustas, became a hugely popular and enduring character during the run of the show. Coustas later reprised the role for several TV specials and series including Effie, Just Quietly, an SBS comedy/interview show, and Greeks on the Roof, a short-lived Greek-Australian version of the British talk show The Kumars at No. 42.

Popular culture
Acropolis Now helped popularise the term "skippy" or "skip" to refer to Anglo-Celtic Australians and others of European but non-Mediterranean descent. This term (inspired by the iconic 60's TV series Skippy the Bush Kangaroo) became popular with Mediterranean-Australians, and to a lesser extent non-Mediterranean people, especially in Melbourne.

Production
The program was produced by Crawford Productions which is now owned by WIN Television.

Characters

Overview

Other characters
 Russell Crowe – Danny O'Brien (Soccer Star)
 Anthony Brandon Wong – Guido Mazzio (Italian-Asian; Guido Rosi's cousin)
 Warren Mitchell – Kostas "Con" Stefanidis (Jim's Father)
 Zlatko Kasumovic – Vlad (Harry's Brother; the bouncer)
 Lawrence Mah – Colin (Chinese Green Grocer)
 Tony Poli (S03E07) & Joe Perrone (S04E02) – Vinnie Vincenzo (Owner: Vinnie's Bistro, Jim's long-time rival)
 Gerry Connolly – Larry (Wheel of Language Host)
 Vince D'Amico – Don Santo (The Italian Godfather)
 Di Adams – Michael "Mike" (Female Masculine Chef)
 Fotis Pelekis – Dimi Stefanidis (The Kid; Jim's Identical teenage year 10 wagging school Cousin)

Awards 
The show itself did not win any awards, but Mary Coustas won the 1993 Logie for Most Popular Comedy Performer for her role as Effie.

Home media-DVD release 
Acropolis Now has been released as a complete series boxset by Crawfords Online Store. The boxset contains all 63 episodes on a 15 disc set, along with episode synopses and out-takes from episodes as a special feature.

Filming location
Although the Acropolis cafè/hotel was filmed in HSV-7 Studios, the exterior is still standing and looks almost identical to the show. It is located on 251 Brunswick Street, and corner of Greeves Street, Fitzroy, Melbourne, Australia.

See also 
 List of Australian television series

References

External links
 
 Crawfords
Acropolis Now at the National Film and Sound Archive

Australian television sitcoms
Seven Network original programming
1989 Australian television series debuts
1992 Australian television series endings
Greek-Australian culture in Melbourne
Television shows set in Melbourne
Australian workplace comedy television series